Juan Antonio Echeverría Rodriguez (born 9 October 1991) is a Uruguayan rugby union player who generally plays as a prop represents Uruguay internationally. He was included in the Uruguayan squad for the 2019 Rugby World Cup which was held in Japan for the first time and also marked his first World Cup appearance.

Career 
He made his international debut for Uruguay against Paraguay on 26 April 2014. He was also part of the Uruguayan team which won the 2017 World Rugby Nations Cup.

References

External links

1991 births
Living people
Austin Gilgronis players
Expatriate rugby union players in the United States
Rugby union props
Sportspeople from Florida
Uruguay international rugby union players
Uruguayan expatriate rugby union players
Uruguayan expatriate sportspeople in the United States
Peñarol Rugby players
Uruguayan rugby union players
American Raptors players